The Downtown Waycross Historic District in Waycross, Georgia is a  historic district which was listed on the National Register of Historic Places in 1992.

It includes the Post Office, the Phoenix Hotel among totals of 47 contributing buildings, two other contributing structures, two contributing sites, and three contributing objects in the district.

Also the Bunn Building was Waycross's first "skyscraper", among the first reinforced concrete buildings in the state.  It is a five-story building which was home for offices and a Masonic Lodge.

See also	
Waycross Historic District, also NRHP-listed

References

External links

Historic districts on the National Register of Historic Places in Georgia (U.S. state)
Italianate architecture in Georgia (U.S. state)
Buildings and structures completed in 1902
National Register of Historic Places in Ware County, Georgia